"Cryin' Like a Bitch", stylized as "Cryin' Like a Bitch!!", is a song by the American rock band Godsmack, released as the first single from The Oracle.

Sound

Sully Erna describing the song as one of the toughest songs on the record.
"It's a really tough song, very tough song, very tough riff, the drums are very aggressive and tight, the whole groove just had an edge to it, so not only did the lyrical content match the music very well, but it also just made me feel it just needed to be a gang, a gang enhancement on the chorus."

Song meaning
HardDrive Radio described the lyrics to "Cryin' Like a Bitch" as "a slam on an old bandmate that kicked Sully out of his band".
In a video posted on Rockpit.com on 26 February, Sully Erna admitted that "Cryin' Like a Bitch" was inspired by events of last summer's Crüe Fest 2 tour, on which Godsmack appeared alongside headliners Mötley Crüe, along with the events with his old band.

Although Sully Erna was reluctant to say specifically who the song is about, stating "because I don't want to throw anyone under the bus," he noted, "It was more about just being fed up with prima donnas and certain rock stars in this industry that still feel they can push people around and are still relevant even though it's been about 20 years since they've had their big moment." But he admitted that one particular person gave him the idea for the song. He explains that it grew out of hearing this person whine about certain things, which got on his nerves. But he's not necessarily complaining. Erna laughs as he adds, "It's a great song so I appreciate those people being the way they are. It helps inspire me."

In a 2009 interview with Artisan News Service, Sully Erna revealed that last summer's Crüe Fest 2 travelling festival turned out to be "the most dramatic tour" the band have ever been on, with the kind of "rock-star garbage" on the part of the tour's headliners that Erna and his bandmates had "never seen before in their career."

In an interview with the Artisan News Service, Mötley Crüe drummer Tommy Lee was asked for his comment on Erna's remarks. He refused to comment, stating that he would "stay out of all that."

During an interview with StaticMultimedia.com, Larkin revealed the true story behind "Cryin' Like a Bitch", and what exactly happened at Crüe Fest:

Then he adds:

Release
The single was released on February 23 
In February, the song was made available on AOL Radio's Hard Rock station.

Digital download

The single became available through iTunes US, iTunes Canada, and Amazon on March 2.

Track listing

Music video
In an interview with Power 97, Sully Erna stated that Godsmack has finished shooting a video for the single.

The video premiered on April 15 via MySpace, and YouTube. The video features Ultimate Fighting Championship champions Chuck Liddell, Rashad Evans, Brock Lesnar, Diego Sanchez, BJ Penn, and Matt Hughes brutally knocking out the competition and showcasing their strength while Godsmack performs the song in a warehouse.

Live performance
On May 3, Godsmack made an appearance on The Tonight Show with Jay Leno in which they performed "Cryin' Like a Bitch" live for the first time.

Chart performance
"Cryin' Like a Bitch" climbed the Billboard Alternative Songs, the Billboard Hot Mainstream Rock Tracks and the Billboard Rock Songs, reaching number twenty-five, one, and seven respectively, making it the band's 18th Top 10 hit at active rock radio. According to Billboard.com, "Cryin' Like a Bitch" began with 4.3 million first-week audience impressions on 92 stations.

The single debuted on the Billboard Heatseekers Songs, Billboard Digital Songs, and Billboard Hot 100  at number one, fifty-nine, and seventy-four respectively. 
According to Billboard.com, "Cryin' Like a Bitch" is just the band second listing on the Heatseekers Songs, and third on the Hot 100.

According to Universal Republic Records, "Cryin' Like a Bitch", which debuted February 23, 2010, had become most added new Active Rock single of the year, and had blazed to the top of the chart reaching number one in only 6 weeks. "Cryin' Like a Bitch" is the 15th Top Five hit for the group, more than artists such as Linkin Park, Foo Fighters, and others. It also marks Godsmack's record-breaking 18th Top 10 single of their career.

With "Cryin' Like a Bitch" appearing on the Billboard Alternative Songs, Godsmack became the act with the most appearances on the chart without having a number one single. The single is Godsmack's 18th charted title.

Charts

Weekly charts

Year-end charts

Certifications

Personnel
 Sully Erna - Vocals, Rhythm guitar, Producer
 Tony Rombola - Lead guitar
 Robbie Merrill - Bass
 Shannon Larkin - Drums
 Dave Fortman - Producer

References

External links
 YouTube - Godsmack - Cryin' Like A Bitch!!

2010 singles
Godsmack songs
2010 songs
Songs written by Sully Erna
Songs written by Tony Rombola
Songs written by Robbie Merrill
Universal Republic Records singles